Leonardo Mocenigo (died 1623) was a Roman Catholic prelate who served as Bishop of Ceneda (1599–1623).

Biography
On 3 January 1599, Leonardo Mocenigo was appointed during the papacy of Pope Clement VIII as Bishop of Ceneda.
In 1599, he was consecrated bishop by Pope Clement VIII.
He served as Bishop of Ceneda until his death on 20 May 1623.
While bishop, he was the principal co-consecrator of Giovanni Delfino (camerlengo), Bishop of Vicenza (1603).

References

External links and additional sources
 (for Chronology of Bishops) 
 (for Chronology of Bishops) 

16th-century Roman Catholic bishops in the Republic of Venice
17th-century Roman Catholic bishops in the Republic of Venice
Bishops appointed by Pope Clement VIII
1623 deaths